Pérignac is a commune in the Charente department in southwestern France.

Population

The residents are called Pérignacais.

See also
Communes of the Charente department

References

External links

 Aerial view of Pérignac

Communes of Charente